San Luis (Spanish for "Saint Louis") may refer to:

Places

Argentina
 San Luis Province
 San Luis, Argentina, capital of San Luis Province

Belize
 San Luis, Belize, in Orange Walk District

Colombia
 San Luis, Antioquia, a town and municipality in the Antioquia Department
 San Luis de Palenque, a town and municipality in the Casanare Department

Cuba
 San Luis, Pinar del Río
 San Luis, Santiago de Cuba

Dominican Republic
 Fortaleza San Luis, a Spanish colonial fort in Santiago
 San Luis, Santo Domingo, a town and municipality in the Santo Domingo Province

Guatemala
 San Luis, El Petén

Honduras
San Luis, Santa Bárbara

Mexico
 San Luis, Baja California
 San Luis Acatlán, Guerrero
 San Luis de la Paz, Guanajuato
 San Luis Potosí, a state
 San Luis Potosí, San Luis Potosí, that state's capital city
 San Luis Río Colorado, Sonora
 San Luis Soyatlán, Jalisco
 Sierra San Luis, a mountain range in Chihuahua-Sonora

Peru
 San Luis, Ancash, capital of Carlos Fermín Fitzcarrald Province in Ancash Region
 San Luis District, Lima
 San Luis District, Ancash
 San Luis District, Cañete, Lima Region

Philippines
 San Luis, Agusan del Sur
 San Luis, Aurora
 San Luis, Batangas
 San Luis, Pampanga

United States
 San Luis, Arizona
 San Luis, Colorado
 San Luis Mountains in Arizona
 San Luis Obispo, California
 San Luis Reservoir in California
 San Luis Valley in Colorado
 Mission San Luis Rey de Francia in California
 Mission San Luis de Apalachee in Florida

Uruguay
 San Luis, Uruguay, in Canelones Department
 San Luis al Medio, Rocha
 San Luis River, Rocha

Venezuela
 San Luis, Falcón, in the state of Falcón

Other uses
 San Luis Airport (disambiguation)
 San Luis F.C., a Mexican football (soccer) team
 San Luis de Quillota, a Chilean football team
 ARA San Luis, various ships of the Argentine Navy

See also
Saint Louis (disambiguation)
São Luís (disambiguation)
Sant Lluís, a municipality on Menorca, Spain